When You Hear Lou, You've Heard It All is a 1977 album by American R&B singer Lou Rawls, released on the Philadelphia International Records label.  On this album, only four tracks were produced by Gamble & Huff with the remainder shared among other producers.  The album's lead single "Lady Love", while only a moderate R&B hit, proved successful in the crossover market, becoming Rawls' last single to enter the top 30 on the Billboard Hot 100.  When You Hear Lou, You've Heard It All was well-reviewed and sold respectably, peaking at #13 on the R&B albums chart and #41 pop.

The title of the album is a play on the-then current Budweiser advertising slogan "When you say Budweiser, you've said it all".  The Budweiser company had been sponsors of Rawls' live shows in 1976 and 1977, and he could be heard at the time singing on television commercials for the company.  (Rawls' 1978 live album Lou Rawls Live includes a short performance of the original "When you say..." jingle.)

Track listing 
 "Lady Love" (Von Gray, Sherman Marshall) – 4:01
 "I Wish It Were Yesterday" (Bobby Martin, Lee Phillips) – 3:27
 "One Life to Live" (Kenny Gamble, Leon Huff) – 3:53
 "Dollar Green" (Bobby Martin) – 3:09
 "Trade Winds" (Ralph MacDonald, William Salter) – 3:47
 "There Will Be Love" (Gamble, Huff) – 4:20
 "Unforgettable" (Irving Gordon) – 3:25
 "That Would Do It for Me" (Gamble, Huff) – 3:13
 "If I Coulda, Woulda, Shoulda" (Gamble, Huff) – 4:32
 "Not the Staying Kind" (Michael Burton) – 3:52

Personnel 
Lou Rawls – vocals
Barbara Ingram, Carla Benton, Yvette Benson – backing vocals
Charles Collins – drums
Michael "Sugarbear" Foreman – bass
Dennis Harris, Roland Chambers – guitar
Edward Green, Leon Huff – keyboards
Davis Cruse – congas, bongos
Don Renaldo – strings, horns

Singles 
"Lady Love" (US Pop #24, US R&B #21)
"One Life to Live" (US R&B #32, AC #10)
"There Will Be Love" (US R&B #76)

References

External links
 

1977 albums
Lou Rawls albums
Albums produced by Kenneth Gamble
Albums produced by Leon Huff
Albums produced by Bobby Martin
Albums arranged by Bobby Martin
Albums recorded at Sigma Sound Studios
Philadelphia International Records albums